Barnabé is a 1938 French comedy film directed by Alexander Esway and starring Fernandel, Marguerite Moreno and Andrex.

The film's art direction was by André Barsacq and Pierre Schild.

Cast
 Fernandel as Barnabé  
 Marguerite Moreno as La marquise de Marengo  
 Andrex as André Dubreuil 
 Lucien Callamand as Ricavel  
 Germaine Charley as Madame Petit-Durand  
 Charles Dechamps as Adhemar  
 Arthur Devère
 Paulette Dubost as Rose 
 Louis Florencie
 Josseline Gaël as Mado  
 Claude May as Jackie Petit-Durand  
 Max Rogerys 
 Noël Roquevert as Hilaire, Le garde-chasse  
 Roland Toutain as Paul de Marengo  
 Jean Témerson as Firmin  
 Victor Vina

References

Bibliography 
Oscherwitz,  Dayna & Higgins, MaryEllen. The A to Z of French Cinema. Scarecrow Press, 2009.

External links 
 

1938 films
French comedy films
1938 comedy films
1930s French-language films
Films directed by Alexander Esway
French black-and-white films
Films scored by Casimir Oberfeld
1930s French films